Calingunee is a rural locality in the Goondiwindi Region, Queensland, Australia.

Geography 
The locality is bounded by the Weir River to the north-west and south-west.

The Leichhardt Highway passes through the locality from north (Moonie) to south (Billa Billa).

Calingunee State Forest 1 is the north-west of the locality, while Calingunee State Forest 2 is in the north-east of the locality. Apart from these, the land use is predominantly grazing on native vegetation with some cropping.

History 

Education 
There are no schools in the locality. The nearest primary schools are Moonie State School in neighbouring Moonie to the north and Lundavra State School in neighbouring Lundavra to the south-west. The nearest secondary school is  Goondiwindi State High School in Goondiwindi to the south.

References 

Goondiwindi Region
Localities in Queensland